Megophrys montana (Asian horned frog, horned frog, Asian spadefoot toad, Javan horned frog, Malayan leaf frog) is a species of frog found in Java and possibly Sumatra.

Description
Megophrys montana is a relatively large frog: males can reach  in snout-vent length and females . As their common name suggests, these frogs have "horns": their upper eyelids have horn-like elongations.

Distribution and habitat
Known with certainty only from Java and possibly from western Sumatra, Indonesia. Records of Megophrys montana outside this range (from Thailand southeast to Sumatra, Natuna Islands, Borneo, and the Philippines) apply to related named and unnamed species. They occur from near sea level up to at least . Megophrys montana live on the forest floor in primary and secondary forests, and to some extent, plantations.

Behaviour
These frogs are relatively clumsy and rely on camouflage for defense. They do not move unless touched or molested.

References

Megophrys
Amphibians of Indonesia
Endemic fauna of Indonesia
Amphibians described in 1822
Taxa named by Johan Conrad van Hasselt